Dafydd Hughes (born 8 January 1996) is a Welsh rugby union player who plays for the Scarlets as a hooker. He is a Wales under-20 international.

Hughes started his career at Llandovery, and he made 22 appearances in his debut season. He also scored 3 tries in the process.

Hughes was then awarded his first professional Scarlets contract on 25 May 2016

Hughes started every game for the Wales U20's grand slam winning team in the 2016 Six Nations Under 20s Championship. He also scored a try on his Wales U20 debut. He also started in all but one of Wales U20's games in the 2016 World Rugby Under 20 Championship.

His Scarlets debut came in the Anglo-Welsh Cup against Newport Gwent Dragons, a game in which he scored a try.

References 

1996 births
Rugby union players from Carmarthen
Llandovery RFC players
Living people
Scarlets players
Welsh rugby union players
Rugby union hookers